The Human Cell Atlas is a project to describe all cell types in the human body. The initiative was announced by a consortium after its inaugural meeting in London in October 2016, which established the first phase of the project. Aviv Regev and Sarah Teichmann defined the goals of the project at that meeting, which was convened by the Broad Institute, the Wellcome Trust Sanger Institute and Wellcome Trust. Regev and Teichmann lead the project.

Description
The Human Cell Atlas will catalogue a cell based on several criteria, specifically the cell type, its state, its location in the body, the transitions it undergoes, and its lineage. It will gather data from existing research, and integrate it with data collected in future research projects. Among the data it will collect is the  fluxome, genome, metabolome, proteome, and transcriptome.

Its scope is to categorize the 37 trillion cells of the human body to determine which genes each cell expresses by sampling cells from all parts of the body.

All aspects of the project will be made "available to the public for free", including software and results.

By April 2018, the project included more than 480 researchers conducting 185 projects.

Funding
In October 2017, the Chan Zuckerberg Initiative announced funding for 38 projects related to the Human Cell Atlas. Among them was a grant of undisclosed value to the Zuckerman Institute of the Columbia University Medical Center at Columbia University. The grant, titled "A strategy for mapping the human spinal cord with single cell resolution", will fund research to identify and catalogue gene activity in all spinal cord cells. The Translational Genomics Research Institute received a grant to develop a standard for the "processing and storage of solid tissues for single-cell RNA sequencing", compared to the typical practice of relying on the average of sequencing multiple cells. Project home pages are available from https://www.czbiohub.org/tabula-projects/.

The program is also backed by European Union, the National Institutes of Health in the United States, and the Manton Foundation.

Data
In April 2018, the first data set from the project was released, representing 530,000 immune system cells collected from bone marrow and cord blood.

A research program at the Max Planck Institute of Immunobiology and Epigenetics published an atlas of the cells of the liver, using single-cell RNA sequencing on 10,000 normal cells obtained from nine donors.

The Tabula Sapeins data was published on a dedicated website

See also
List of distinct cell types in the adult human body
Human Genome Project 
ENCODE - Encyclopedia of DNA Elements (ENCODE) 
Human Protein Atlas

Notes

References

Further reading

External links

Biological databases
Proteomics
Online databases